"Lift" is the second single by Australian singer Shannon Noll from his second album of the same name (2005). The song debuted at number 13 during the Christmas season, and during its fourth week on the Australian Singles Chart, it peaked at number 10. The boxing-themed video clip for this song was shot in an unused warehouse in Sydney's Marrickville by Australian director Anthony Rose, who also directed Noll's music videos for "Drive", "What About Me" and "Shine".

Track listings
CD single
 "Lift" (single version) – 4:19
 "Lift" (album version) – 3:56
 "Lift" (music video)
 "Shine" (music video)

Digital single
 "Lift" (single version) – 4:19
 "Lift" (album version) – 3:56

Charts

Weekly charts

Year-end charts

Certifications

References

2005 singles
2005 songs
APRA Award winners
Shannon Noll songs
Songs written by Andrew Roachford
Songs written by Shannon Noll
Sony BMG singles